Admiral Sir Allen Gordon Tait,  (30 October 1921 – 29 May 2005) was a senior Royal Navy officer who served as Second Sea Lord and Chief of Naval Personnel from 1977 to 1979.

Naval career
Tait joined the Royal Navy as a cadet in 1939. He served in the Second World War with the Arctic convoys from 1939. He served in submarines in the Mediterranean and Far East from 1942 until the end of the war, being awarded the Distinguished Service Cross for his skill and courage as a gunnery officer.

Tait was made commanding officer of the submarine  in 1947 and the submarine  in 1948, before becoming Aide-de-camp to Lieutenant General Sir Bernard Freyberg, Governor General of New Zealand, in 1949. He went on to be Assistant Naval Adviser at the UK High Commission in Canada in 1957, and commanded the destroyer  from 1960.

In 1965, Tait was given command of the frigate  and the 2nd Destroyer Squadron in the Far East, and in 1967 he took over the submarine depot ship  and the 3rd Submarine Squadron. He was appointed Chief of Staff at Submarine Command in 1969 and made commander of the Royal Naval College Dartmouth in 1970. In 1972 he became Naval Secretary at the Ministry of Defence and in 1975 he was made Flag Officer, Plymouth and Admiral Superintendent at Devonport. He last appointment was as Second Sea Lord and Chief of Naval Personnel in 1977. He retired in 1979.

Family
Tait married Philippa Todd, daughter of Sir Bryan Todd, in 1952. He was survived by their two sons and two daughters.

References

|-

|-

1921 births
2005 deaths
People from Timaru
New Zealand military personnel
Royal Navy admirals
Knights Commander of the Order of the Bath
Lords of the Admiralty
Recipients of the Distinguished Service Cross (United Kingdom)
Royal Navy submarine commanders
Royal Navy officers of World War II
Todd family